"Trapped by a Thing Called Love" is the debut 1971 crossover hit single by Denise LaSalle and was written by LaSalle who also co-produced the song with Bill Jones.

"Trapped by a Thing Called Love" was a gold record and her biggest hit on the US Soul chart where it went to number one,  and her only Top 40 pop hit peaking at number thirteen.

Chart performance

References

1971 singles
1971 songs
Denise LaSalle songs